D-2 is a professional digital videocassette format created by Ampex and introduced in 1988 at the NAB Show as a composite video alternative to the component video D-1 format. It garnered Ampex a technical Emmy in 1989. Like D-1, D-2 stores uncompressed digital video on a tape cassette; however, it stores a  composite video signal, rather than component video as with D-1. While component video is superior for advanced editing, especially when chroma key effects are used, composite video was more compatible with most analog facilities existing at the time.

History
Ampex created the first D-2 video machine, the ACR-225 commercial spot player working with Sony, who had done some early research into composite digital video, as a cost-effective solution for TV broadcasters with large investments in composite analog infrastructure such as video routers and switchers, since it could be inserted into existing analog broadcast facilities without extensive redesign or modifications. This was because D-2 machines accepted standard analog video and audio inputs and outputs. D-2 machines are capable of interfacing through either serial digital video or analog video connections. Four PCM audio channels are available for editing (an improvement over the then-popular Type C analog machines with two audio channels) as well as an analog cue channel and timecode, also with digital or analog connections.

Features
Like D-1, D-2 uses 19 mm (¾ inch) tape loaded into three different sized videocassettes to support commercial spot playback as well as long-form programming such as movies.

Ampex D-2 tape transports are extremely fast. A high speed search at 60 times playback speed with a recognizable color picture allowed three hours of videotape to be searched through in approximately three minutes.

The D-2 offered read before write or preread functionality, which allowed simultaneous playback and recording on the same transport. For example, a title could be superimposed over existing video already on the same video tape by playing the tape through a video switcher, adding the title, and recording the new composite image back onto the same location of the tape. This eliminated the need for an additional recorder and saved considerable time in video editing. Steven Fuiten was the first PreRead Editor to composite video using a full D2 digital system.

Acceptance
During its early stages, finished episodes of South Park were hastily recorded to D-2 to be sent to Comedy Central for airing in just a few days' time. D-2 replaced Type C videotape for the mastering of LaserDiscs in the late 1980s.

D-2 was in widespread use for some ten years, as the computer-based video server (with fewer moving parts and correspondingly greater reliability) became available not long after its release. By 2003, only a handful of broadcasters continued to use the D-2 format, and even then only to access materials recorded on the format.

Panasonic introduced D-3 in 1991; it is very similar to D-2  as it uses a smaller cassette case.

Format Description
 General:
 Format name: D2 digital                               
 SMPTE type:   D2
 Format type: digital composite   
 Scanning system: multi head segmented helical
 Year introduced: 1989   
 Developer: Ampex/Sony    
 Physical Data: 
 Tape width: 19 mm   
 Tape speed(s):  5.19 ips
 Tape thickness:  .55 mils  
 Playing time(s):  32, 94, 208 minutes (Small, Medium, Large cassette sizes)
 Headwheel diameter: 2.95"    
 Speed: 5400 rpm
 Head-to-tape writing speed:  1078 in/sec.  
 Sampling rate: 4fsc (14.31818 MHz for NTSC)    
 No. of bits: 8
 Data rate: 60.1 MB/sec (480.8Mbps)
 Audio: 
 No. of digital channels:  4   
 Sampling rate: 48 kHz  
 No. of bits: 20

Models

Ampex
VPR-200, VPR-250, VPR-300
ACR-225 Commercial Spot Player (robotic tape system)
Sony
DVR-10, DVR-18, DVR-20, DVR-28
DCR-10, DCR-18, DCR-20, DCR-28 (sold by BTS)
DVC 80, DVC 1000s LMS (Library Management System)

See also
 DVCAM
 DVCPRO
 D-1 (Sony)
 D-3 (video)
 D5 HD
 D6 HDTV VTR

References

External links
allmobilevideo.com: D2 Specs
Google Books: The History of Television, 1942 to 2000 By Albert Abramson
 Google Books: The Art of Digital Video, by John Watkinson
lionlamb.us: Ampex Digital VTR Catalog
lionlamb.us: Ampex ACR-225
tech-notes.tv: Ampex history
ampex.com: Ampex history
D-1, D-2 & D-3: histories of digital video tape

Video storage
Composite video formats